The Daily is a daily news podcast produced by the American newspaper The New York Times, hosted by Michael Barbaro and Sabrina Tavernise. Its weekday episodes are based on the Times reporting of the day, with interviews of journalists from The New York Times. Episodes typically last 20 to 30 minutes.

Background 
The Daily launched in January 2017, hosted by the Times political journalist Michael Barbaro, as an extension of The New York Times' 2016 election-focused podcast, The Run-Up.

The Daily is based on interviews with Times journalists, in which they summarize and comment on their story, and is complemented by recordings related to the topic, or original reporting such as interviews with persons involved in the story, and letting them speak uninterrupted. A summary of headlines concludes the podcast.

The Daily is free to listen and financed by advertising; it is profitable according to the Times. The Times said it intended to build a news podcast franchise around it, beginning with a spin-off podcast, The New Washington, in summer 2017. The New Washington ran from July 2017 until December of the same year. A children's edition of The Daily was also planned. In January 2019, The Daily launched a weekly newsletter.

In March 2022, Barbaro was joined by the second host Sabrina Tavernise, following her guest hosting and reports including the Russian invasion of Ukraine.

Opening theme 
The opening theme for The Daily is composed by Jim Brunberg and Ben Landsverk of the band Wonderly. It has been inspired by Barbaro suggesting the composers the theme for the series Westworld, and the siren element has been to act as "the audio DNA of the show and metaphor for the show itself." A slight variation entitled "Daily Theme" was featured on Wonderly's 2018 self-released digital album Homefront.

Spinoff TV series 

The success of the podcast led to a weekly documentary series The Weekly on FX, with its first episode airing on June 2, 2019. Initially, The Weekly was a narrative investigative journalism docuseries covering recent topical news and cultural stories, which later lead into longer documentaries, as The New York Times Presents.

Reception 
Started in January 2017, The Daily became a noted success for the Times; TheStreet described it as "a phenomenon, an out-of-the-blue hit." It had 3.8 million individual listeners by August 2017, and was regularly in the top ten most-listened podcasts by autumn 2017. The New Yorker attributed this success, in part, to the podcast's "conversational and intimate" tone, which made news more accessible, and to Barbaro's "idiosyncratic intonation" (he is known to say "hmm" after interesting commentary from guests, a habit that has generated much online commentary from listeners).

The podcast began being syndicated to radio by American Public Media in 2018. As of June 2018, the podcast receives 1.1 million downloads every weekday, and 2 millions in January 2020. It was recognized as the Webby Voice of the Year, a Special Achievement award at the 2020 Webby Awards.

See also 
 List of daily news podcasts
Political podcast

References

External links

Most recent episode

2017 podcast debuts
Political podcasts
The New York Times
Audio podcasts
American journalism
News podcasts
American podcasts